The 1995 College Football All-America Team is composed of the following All-American Teams: Associated Press, United Press International, Football Writers Association of America, American Football Coaches Association, Walter Camp Foundation, The Sporting News and Football News. 

The College Football All-America Team is an honor given annually to the best American college football players at their respective positions. The original usage of the term All-America seems to have been to such a list selected by football pioneer Walter Camp in the 1890s. The NCAA officially recognizes All-Americans selected by the AP, UPI, AFCA, FWAA, WCFF, TSN, and FN to determine Consensus All-Americans.

Offense

Quarterback
Tommie Frazier, Nebraska (College Football Hall of Fame) (AP-1, UPI, Walter Camp, AFCA-Coaches, FWAA-Writers, TSN)
Danny Wuerffel, Florida (College Football Hall of Fame) (AP-2, FN)

Running backs
Eddie George, Ohio State (College Football Hall of Fame) (AP-1, UPI, Walter Camp, AFCA-Coaches, FWAA-Writers, TSN, FN)
Troy Davis, Iowa State (College Football Hall of Fame) (AP-1, UPI, Walter Camp, AFCA-Coaches, TSN, FN)
Darnell Autry, Northwestern (AP-2)
George Jones, San Diego St. (AP-2)

Wide receivers
Keyshawn Johnson, USC  (AP-1, UPI, Walter Camp, AFCA-Coaches, FWAA-Writers, TSN, FN)
Terry Glenn, Ohio State  (AP-1, UPI, Walter Camp, FWAA-Writers, TSN, FN)
Marcus Harris, Wyoming  (AFCA-Coaches)
Alex Van Dyke, Nevada (AP-2)
Chris Doering, Florida (AP-2)

Tight end
Marco Battaglia, Rutgers (AP-1, UPI, Walter Camp, AFCA-Coaches, FWAA-Writers, TSN, FN)
Brian Roche, San Jose St. (AP-2)

Guards/tackles
Orlando Pace, Ohio State (College Football Hall of Fame) (AP-1, UPI, Walter Camp, AFCA-Coaches, FWAA-Writers, TSN, FN)
Jonathan Ogden, UCLA (College Football Hall of Fame) (AP-1, UPI, Walter Camp, AFCA-Coaches, FWAA-Writers, TSN, FN)
Jason Odom, Florida (AP-1, UPI, Walter Camp, AFCA-Coaches, FWAA-Writers, TSN, FN)
Jeff Hartings, Penn State (AP-2, UPI, Walter Camp, AFCA-Coaches, TSN)
Dan Neil, Texas (AP-2, FWAA-Writers)
Heath Irwin, Colorado (AP-1)
Willie Anderson, Auburn (AP-2)
Jason Layman, Tennessee (AP-2)

Center 
Bryan Stoltenberg, Colorado (UPI, Walter Camp, FN)
Clay Shiver, Florida State (AP-2, AFCA-Coaches, FWAA-Writers, TSN)
Aaron Graham, Nebraska (AP-1, FN)

Defense

Ends
Tony Brackens, Texas (AP-2, AFCA-Coaches, FWAA-Writers, TSN)
Tim Colston, Kansas State  (AP-2, Walter Camp, AFCA-Coaches)
Cedric Jones, Oklahoma (FWAA-Writers, TSN)
Jared Tomich, Nebraska (AP-1)
Mike Vrabel, Ohio State (FN)

Tackles
Tedy Bruschi, Arizona (College Football Hall of Fame) (AP-1, UPI, Walter Camp, AFCA-Coaches, FWAA-Writers, TSN)
Cornell Brown, Virginia Tech (AP-1, UPI,  FWAA-Writers, TSN, FN)
Marcus Jones, North Carolina (AP-1, UPI, Walter Camp, AFCA-Coaches)
Brandon Mitchell, Texas A&M (AP-2 [as DL], Walter Camp)
Jason Horn, Michigan (AP-2 [as DL] AFCA-Coaches)

Linebackers
Zach Thomas, Texas Tech (College Football Hall of Fame) (AP-1, UPI, Walter Camp, AFCA-Coaches, FWAA-Writers, TSN, FN)
Pat Fitzgerald, Northwestern (College Football Hall of Fame) (AP-1, UPI, AFCA-Coaches, FWAA-Writers, TSN)
Kevin Hardy, Illinois (AP-1, UPI, Walter Camp, FWAA-Writers, TSN, FN)
Ray Lewis, Miami (Fla.) (AP-1, UPI)
Simeon Rice, Illinois (AP-2, Walter Camp, FN)
Duane Clemons, California (AP-2)
Terrell Farley, Nebraska (AP-2)

Backs
Aaron Beasley, West Virginia (AP-2, UPI, Walter Camp, AFCA-Coaches, FN)
Lawyer Milloy, Washington (AP-1, UPI, Walter Camp, AFCA-Coaches, FWAA-Writers, TSN, FN)
Chris Canty, Kansas State (AP-1, UPI, FWAA-Writers, TSN, FN)
Greg Myers, Colorado State (AP-1, UPI, Walter Camp, TSN)
Alex Molden, Oregon (AP-2, AFCA-Coaches)
Adrian Robinson, Baylor (AFCA-Coaches)
Ray Mickens, Texas A&M (Walter Camp)
Kevin Abrams, Syracuse  (FWAA-Writers, TSN)
Marcus Coleman, Texas Tech (FWAA-Writers)
Percy Ellsworth, Virginia (AP-2, FN)
Brian Dawkins, Clemson (AP-2)

Specialists

Placekicker
Michael Reeder, TCU (AP-1, AFCA-Coaches, FWAA-Writers, TSN, FN)
Sam Valenzisl, Northwestern (AP-2)

Punter
Brad Maynard, Ball State (AP-1, Walter Camp, AFCA-Coaches, TSN, FN)
Will Brice, Virginia (FWAA-Writers)
Brian Gragert, Wyoming (AP-2)

All-purpose / kick returners 
Marvin Harrison, Syracuse (FWAA-Writers-Ret, TSN-Ret)
Leeland McElroy, Texas A&M (AP-All-purpose-1)
Ricky Whittle, Oregon (AP-All-purpose-2)

References

All-America Team
College Football All-America Teams